The Dean of Ross is based at the Cathedral Church of St. Fachtna in Rosscarbery in the Diocese of Ross within the united bishopric of Cork, Cloyne and Ross of the Church of Ireland.

The incumbent is Cliff Jeffers.

List of deans (Church of Ireland; incomplete)

1591 Robert Sturton 
1615–1630 Hugh Persevall 
1630/1 William Bolton 
1637–1639 George Horley or Horsey
1639 John Chappel
1639–1661 Mark Pagett
1663/4 John Everleigh 
1678/9-1710 Rowland Davies
1710–1717 Richard Griffith
1717–1732 Valentine French
1733–1743 Jemmett Browne (afterwards Bishop of Killaloe, 1743) 
1743–1772 Arthur St George
1772–1813 Wensley Bond 
1813–1829 James Forward Bond 
1830–1876 James Stannus 
1876–?1905 Isaac Morgan Reeves (died 1905)
c.1907–1914 John Halahan (died 1920)
1914–>1925 Harry Becher (died 1929)
c.1933 Charles Webster
<1954–>1965 Raymond Beresford-Poer (died 1983)
1968–1978 Arthur Gordon
 John Fleming
1995–1998 Richard Henderson (afterwards Bishop of Tuam, Killala and Achonry, 1998)
1998–2021 Christopher Peters
2022–present Cliff Jeffers

References

 
Diocese of Cork, Cloyne and Ross
Ross